TAT-6 was the sixth transatlantic telephone cable. It was in operation from 1976 to 1994, with a bandwidth of 12MHz (4,000 telephone circuits) between Green Hill (United States) and Saint-Hilaire-de-Riez, Vendée, (France).

The SG Undersea Cable System was designed by Bell Laboratories at their Allentown, PA, Greensboro, NC, Holmdel, NJ, and Whippany, NJ facilities.

A few years later, TAT-7 was put into service between Tuckerton, New Jersey, and Lands End, England, and was the last analog Transatlantic undersea system.

The following system, TAT-8, was implemented by AT&T (with Bell Laboratories), STC (with British Telecom), and Alcatel (with France Telecom). This was the first Transatlantic fiber-optic system, had greatly increased capacity and performance.

References

Infrastructure completed in 1976
Transatlantic communications cables
France–United States relations
AT&T buildings
British Telecom buildings and structures
Orange S.A.
1976 establishments in France
1976 establishments in Rhode Island
1994 disestablishments in France
1994 disestablishments in Rhode Island